Dara Moskowitz Grumdahl is a food and wine writer, based in Minneapolis, Minnesota.

Personal life
Dara Moskowitz was born and raised in New York City and graduated from Stuyvesant High School in 1988. She got her start in the world of food as a dishwasher. She graduated from Carleton College in Northfield, Minnesota in 1992. She lives with her family in Minneapolis and is a senior writer for Mpls.St.Paul Magazine.

Writing
Originally focusing on fiction writing, she won two Minnesota State Arts Board grants, a fellowship from the Loft McKnight foundation, and the Tamarack Award in 1994. She was chosen by Joyce Carol Oates for the anthology American Fiction, Volume Nine: The Best Unpublished Short Stories by Emerging Authors. Her primary outlet for food writing from 1995 to 2008 was in the City Pages, a Minneapolis-St. Paul alternative weekly owned by Village Voice Media. Currently, she works for MSP Communications, where she writes for both Delta Sky Magazine as a travel writer and Mpls St. Paul Magazine with a restaurant column, profiles, and feature stories. She has been nominated for eleven James Beard Awards for both her food and wine writing and has won five times; her most recent nomination was for an MFK Fisher Distinguished Writing Award for “The Cheese Artist”. In both 2011 and 2013  she won the City and Regional Magazine Association Award as the nation's best restaurant critic in a city magazine. She has also written for Gourmet Magazine, USA Today, Wine & Spirits, Bon Appetit, Food and Wine, and Saveur. Her writing has been included in five editions of Best Food Writing.

Drink This: Wine Made Simple

In her first book on wine, Grumdahl draws on her own experience to aid the reader into better understanding their own tastes and preferences as a guide to exploring the world of wine. The book presents nine parties to have at home to discover the reader's own taste when it comes to nine major varieties of wine including Zinfandel, Sauvignon blanc, Riesling, Chardonnay, Cabernet Sauvignon, Syrah, Sangiovese, Tempranillo, and Pinot noir. The book features some wine history and economics of the industry as well as interviews from such critics, winemakers, and chefs as Robert M. Parker, Jr., Paul Draper, and Thomas Keller. Drink This: Wine Made Simple was released on November 24, 2009, by Ballantine Books (an imprint of Random House).

Radio 
In 2012, Grumdahl began a radio program—Off the Menu—on WCCO, the Minneapolis CBS radio station. The program broadcasts live on Saturday mornings and includes a mix of conversations with guests (Gabriel Rucker, Dominique Ansel, Nina Teicholz) and answers to listener questions. Grumdahl also appears weekly on WCCO on Chad Hartman and is an occasional guest on MPR.

Live Events 
In Minnesota, Grumdahl frequently emcees live events such as the Andrew Zimmern and Anthony Bourdain tour Guts & Glory, the Fran Lebowitz interview for Living Legends, the Mpls. St. Paul Magazine Tastemakers live series and the MPR Top Coast festival.

References

Living people
Year of birth missing (living people)
American food writers
Wine writers
Carleton College alumni
Stuyvesant High School alumni
Writers from New York City
Writers from Minneapolis
James Beard Foundation Award winners